The 1965 Indian Everest Expedition reached the summit of Mount Everest on 20 May 1965. It was the first successful scaling of the mountain by an Indian climbing expedition. 

After the first conquest of Mount Everest in 1953 by the New Zealander Edmund Hillary and Sherpa Tenzing Norgay, Indian military forces made several attempts to conquer the summit. The first expedition by the Indian Army, which was led by Brigadier Gyan Singh in 1960, failed. Climbers Colonel Narendra Kumar, Sonam Gyatso, and Sherpa Nawang Gombu reached , just  from the summit, but had to turn back due to extremely bad weather. The second expedition by the Indian Army, led by Major John Diaz in 1962, also failed. Mohan Singh Kohli was a member of both these expeditions.

Preparation
In 1965, the third Indian expedition, which was led by Mohan Singh Kohli and his deputy Colonel Narendra "Bull" Kumar, included 21 core members of the expedition, and around 50 climbing sherpas. The mission was sponsored by the Indian Mountaineering foundation. The team started their journey from New Delhi on 21 February and reached on Jaynagar railway station in Bihar, the Indo-Nepal border on 24 February. They arranged for 25 tons of materials for the mission from various cities of India, including food, cloths, sleeping tents, oxygen cylinders and mountaineering equipment. All materials were carried from Jaynagar railway station to base camp by 800 porters including women. The initial attempt was at the end of April and due to bad weather they came back to base camp and wait two weeks for better weather. Towards the end of May, Mount Everest was scaled in four successive attempts and put nine climbers on to the summit, setting a world record which India held for 17 years.

Reaching the summit
India became the fourth country to scale Mount Everest.
On 20 May 1965, Lt Col Avatar. S. Cheema and Nawang Gombu Sherpa reached the summit of Mount Everest, becoming the first Indians to do so. This was the second time that Nawang Gombu Sherpa had climbed Mount Everest.  The first was with an American expedition in 1963.  He became the first person to climb the mountain twice.

Two days later, on 22 May, Sonam Gyatso and Sonam Wangyal reached the summit and C. P. Vohra, Ang Kami Sherpa reached it on 24 May.

On 29 May, 12 years to the day from the first ascent of Mount Everest,  Major H. P. S. Ahluwalia, H. C. S. Rawat, Phu Dorjee Sherpa reached the summit. This was the first time three climbers had stood on the summit together.

In all, eleven people were scheduled to climb the mountain in five attempts, but Captain HV Bahuguna and Major BP Singh were forced to retreat due to physical difficulties.

Reception and honours 
Mohan Singh Kohli is best known as leader of the Indian Everest Expedition 1965. The achievement electrified the nation; people danced in the streets. Nine climbers reached the summit, creating a world record that India held for 17 years.  On return of the team from Nepal to India, Prime Minister Lal Bahadur Shastri headed the reception at the airport.

The entire team were given an Arjuna Award. Three members, including the team leader, were awarded the Padma Bhushan and the leader and eight team members were given the Padma Shree. 

Prime Minister Lal Bahadur Shastri paid tribute saying: “The record of Commander Kohli’s expedition will find special mention in history. It was a masterpiece of planning, organisation, teamwork, individual effort and leadership”. Lal Bahadur Shastri also described the 1965 success as one of India's six major achievements after independence.

A full-length film on the expedition with music by Shankar Jaikishan was released all over India and abroad. The story of the achievement was serialized in several national newspapers and magazines. Mohan Singh Kohli and other members of the team were felicitated at Brussels, Paris, Geneva and Rome. Tenzing Norgay accompanied Captain Kohli to several countries. In India, Chief Ministers of almost all the states invited the team to their capitals and honoured them at state and civic receptions.

Records of the expedition 
 First Indian team to successfully climb the Everest
 First time three climbers stood on the summit together
 First time nine climbers reached the summit, setting a world record which India held for 17 years
 First man to climb Everest twice – Nawang Gombu Sherpa
 First time that the oldest (Sonam Gyatso at 42) and the youngest (Sonam Wangyal at 23) climbed Everest together
 First Nepalese to climb Everest – Phu Dorjee Sherpa

Team 
Team leader Captain M S Kohli 
Deputy leader Colonel Narendra "Bull" Kumar 

 Avtar Singh Cheema
 Nawang Gombu Sherpa
 Sonam Gyatso
 Sonam Wangyal
 C. P. Vohra
 Ang Kami
 H. P. S. Ahluwalia
 H. C. S. Rawat
 Phu Dorjee Sherpa
 Captain Harsh Vardhan Bahuguna
 Major B P Singh 
 Gurdial Singh
 Major Mulk Raj
 Captain J C Joshi
 Lt. B N  Rana
 Captain A K Chakravarty( Doctor)
 Dr. D V Telang (Doctor)
 G S Bhanghu (Wireless Operator)
 C.Balakrishnan (Wireless Operator)
 Captain Soares (doctor) returned due to illness

Sherpas 
About 50 Sherpas participated in the mission. Many of them had previously participated in other Everest missions. One of the sherpas, Phu Dorjee Sherpa, reached the summit.

Ang tshering (Sirdar)
Phu Dorjee Sherpa (Assistant Sirdar)
General Thondup
Nawang Hilla
Dawa Norbu I
Ang Dava IV
Ila Tshering 
Ang tshering II
Tenzing Nindra
Ang Nyima
Tenzing Gyatso
Nima Tenzing
Gunden
Passand Tendi
Mingma Tshering (Orderly of Captain M S Kohli)
Pemba Sunder
Sikhu Phorche 
Dahnu
Lobsang Sherpa

See also
Indian summiters of Mount Everest - Year wise
List of Mount Everest records of India
List of Mount Everest records
List of Mount Everest summiters by number of times to the summit

References

External links
Indian Everest Expedition 1965 (25:44 min) on YouTube.

Mount Everest expeditions
1965 in India
1965 in Nepal